The Married Women's Association (MWA) was a British women's organisation founded by Edith Summerskill and Juanita Frances in 1938.

Summerskill became the association's first president. Its original aims were to promote financial equality between husband and wife, to give mothers and children a legal right to a share in the family home, to secure equal guardianship rights for both parents, and to extend the National Insurance Act to give equal provision for women.

The association published Wife and Citizen from 1945 to 1951. Prominent members included Vera Brittain, Juanita Frances, Doreen Gorsky, Helena Normanton, Hazel Hunkins Hallinan and Lady Helen Nutting. In 1952 Helena Normanton's evidence to the Royal Commission on Marriage and Divorce precipitated a split in the association, leading to the establishment of the Council of Married Women.

Its papers are held at the Women's Library.

References

Feminism in the United Kingdom
Women's organisations based in the United Kingdom
Organizations established in 1938
Organizations disestablished in 1988
1938 establishments in the United Kingdom
1988 disestablishments in the United Kingdom